Aditi Keshavdev Sharma (born 5 August 1996 at Jhansi) is an Uttar Pradeshi First-class cricket cricketer. She plays for Uttar Pradesh and Central Zone. She has played 1 First-class, 7 List A cricket and 10 Women's Twenty20 matches. She made her debut in major domestic cricket in a one-day match on 12 December 2014 against Hyderabad.

References 

1996 births
Uttar Pradesh women cricketers
Central Zone women cricketers
People from Jhansi
Living people